Apostolias (before 1927: Κάτω Κάνιανη - Kato Kaniani) is a village in the municipal unit of Gravia, in the northeastern part of Phocis, Greece. In 2011 its population was 53. Apostolias is situated at the foot of Mount Oeta at 520 m above sea level. Until World War II, many of its residents worked in the bauxite mine on the east side of the Agios Vasileios mountain. The mine was destroyed by the occupying Italian forces.

Population

External links
 Apostolias GTP Travel Pages

See also

List of settlements in Phocis

References

Populated places in Phocis